Yamina Méchakra  (1949 Meskiana – 2013 Algiers) was an Algerian novelist and psychiatrist.

Early life

Méchakra was born in 1949 in Meskiana in northern Aures. At age nine, she began writing; taking notes in a "log-book" that grew over time. Two events profoundly marked her childhood: her father was tortured by the French during the Algerian Civil War before her eyes, exposed in the street, attached to the barrel of a tank. Little more is known of her life, although Kateb Yacine wrote in the preface to her book that she had a "cruel and troubled life".

Career 

Méchakra began writing her first novel in 1973, while studying psychiatry at the University of Algiers. Her university thesis in literature was devoted to Apuleius of Madaurus. In Algiers, she met Kateb Yacine before his departure for Rome and Paris. Yamina Méchakra followed Yachine's style in writing, who gave her extended advice and guidance. She needed to rewrite three times to finish her first book, and "La Grotte éclatée" was published in 1979. Yamina Mechakra argued that women was the source of the nation and the founding of an independent state. Referring to the Berber queen known as La Kahina, Kateb Yacine titled his preface of the novel as The Children of Kahina.

While she continued to write during the succeeding years, but did not publish, confiding to a reporter that she lost her manuscripts. In 1997, when she treated a young boy as a psychiatrist, she was inspired writing her second novel Arris, which was published in 1999. Yamina Mechakra is also a committed author who supported the importance of a cultural revolution in Algeria in the process of decolonization.

Death

She died in Algiers on May 19, 2013, at the age of 64, following a long illness.

Works

Notes

References

External links
Yamina Mechakra Untranslated, written by Jill Jarvis and published by Academia, Inc.
Remnants of Empire in Algeria and Vietnam: Women, Words and War review by Claire Eldridge, University of St Andrews. Oxford Journals, Arts & Humanities (French History), volume 21, issue 3, pp. 372–373.

Algerian women writers
Algerian novelists
Algerian women novelists
20th-century novelists
20th-century women writers
People from Oum El Bouaghi Province
University of Algiers alumni
Algerian psychiatrists
1949 births
2013 deaths
Women psychiatrists
21st-century Algerian people